American entertainer Usher has released six video albums and appeared in forty-one music videos, eleven films, nine television programs, and four commercials. Usher released his debut single, "Call Me a Mack" in 1993 from the soundtrack Poetic Justice. Directed by Bille Woodruff, Usher appeared in the video for "You Make Me Wanna...", the lead single from his break-through album My Way (1997). The video shows Usher flanked by four dancers, to which the scene is then replaced by five clones of Usher performing dance routines around chairs. The latter song was sung by the singer on the sitcom Moesha, where he made his television debut. Usher appeared in four episodes for the show, portraying his character, Jeremy Davis. Live (1999) was released to keep Usher's fans satisfied during his four-year break between My Way and 8701 (2001). The video album version was certified gold by the Recording Industry Association of America (RIAA), denoting shipments of 50,000 units. During his musical break, he made his film debut in the 1998 science fiction horror film The Faculty, which received mixed reviews, but was a box office success. Following this, he starred in three films: She's All That (1999), Light It Up (1999) and Texas Rangers (2000).

In 2001, Usher released his third studio album 8701—four music videos for singles from the album were shot. Dave Meyers directed the video for "U Remind Me", in which Chilli of TLC makes a cameo appearance. Usher made several television appearances in 2002, including Sabrina, the Teenage Witch portraying his role as The Love Doctor. The same year, he released concert video album, Usher Live Evolution 8701, which was certified platinum by the RIAA and gold by the British Phonographic Industry (BPI). In 2004, Usher released Confessions, his fourth studio album which featured the lead single "Yeah!". Directed by Little X with co-direction by Usher, the video features blue lasers, drawing inspiration from Michael Jackson's 1979 "Rock with You" video. The video for "Yeah!" received four MTV Video Music Award nominations, winning the awards for Best Male Video and Best Dance Video. The same year, Usher made a guest appearance in the music for Beyoncé Knowles' "Naughty Girl". In 2005, Usher starred in the crime-comedy film In the Mix, portraying the role of Darrell; the film received negative reviews.

Music videos

Video albums

Filmography

Television

Commercials

Notes

References

Videography
Videographies of American artists